Four-time defending champion Esther Vergeer and her partner Sharon Walraven defeated Daniela Di Toro and Aniek van Koot in the final, 6–3, 6–3 to win the women's doubles wheelchair tennis title at the 2010 US Open.

Korie Homan and Vergeer were the reigning champions, but Homan did not participate.

Seeds
 Daniela Di Toro /  Aniek van Koot (final)
 Esther Vergeer /  Sharon Walraven (champions)

Doubles

Finals

External links
Main Draw

Wheelchair Women's Doubles
U.S. Open, 2010 Women's Doubles